Top Ten Chinese Gold Songs Awards is one of the main C-pop music award in Hong Kong.  The award is sponsored by RTHK.  Beginning in 1978, it is the oldest major award in Hong Kong, even earlier than the  Jade Solid Gold Top 10 Awards.  The ceremony is usually held in January following the end of the previous music season.  It usually takes place at the Hong Kong Coliseum, sometimes at the Sha Tin Racecourse.

Award format
The standard format is that the top 10 songs of each year are presented. Also a "Golden Needle" award is presented in some ceremonies as lifetime achievements.

1970s awards
1978, 1979

1980s awards
1980, 1981, 1982, 1983, 1984, 1985, 1986, 1987, 1988, 1989

1990s awards
1990, 1991, 1992, 1993, 1994, 1995, 1996, 1997, 1998, 1999

2000s awards
2000, 2001, 2002, 2003, 2004, 2005, 2006, 2007, 2008, 2009

2010s awards
2010, 2011, 2012, 2013, 2014, 2015, 2016, 2017, 2019

Golden Needle Award
The award is not given every year.

International Pop Poll Awards
RTHK also presents the International Pop Poll Awards annually. James Fung Wai-tong, chairman of the organising committee, said that from 1990 onwards, the awards ceremony had already given prizes to over 200 international pop songs, widening the perspectives of both the public and the local music industry with a diversified music culture.

See also
 Jade Solid Gold Top 10 Awards
 New Talent Singing Awards
 List of Hong Kong music awards

References

Cantopop
RTHK